Riegle is a surname. Notable people with the surname include:

Donald W. Riegle Jr. (born 1938), American author, businessman, US Representative and US Senator from Michigan
Ed Riegle (1924–2003), Canadian professional ice hockey player and coach
Gene Riegle (1928–2011), American harness racing driver and trainer
Merl Riegle (1950–2015), American crossword constructor
Roy Wilford Riegle, (1896–1988), American attorney and former state Representative

See also
Riegle Report, officially titled U.S. Chemical and Biological Warfare-Related Dual Use Exports to Iraq and their Possible Impact on the Health Consequences of the Gulf War
Riegle-Neal Interstate Banking and Branching Efficiency Act of 1994 (IBBEA)
Riel (disambiguation)